The Fallen Empires Tour was a world tour by Scottish/Northern Irish alternative rock band Snow Patrol.

Background
The tour was announced on September 20, 2011 with dates in Dublin and Belfast only. Tickets for these shows went on sale on September 22, 2011. These two shows sold out causing the band to add a further date in Dublin with two extra shows being announced for Belfast. The first continental Europe show were announced in October 2011 with dates across Germany. A show in Rotterdam was announced for March 1, this show sold out within 30 minutes of going on sale resulting in another show being added for the following night. Shows in Denmark and Sweden were announced on November 23. The band will also make to debut appearance in Dubai when they perform at the Atlantis Hotel Open Air Event alongside Calvin Harris on March 9. The band will also make their debut appearance in Oman, playing the InterContinental Gardens. It was also announced they would play a show at Dublin's Phoenix Park, they will co-headline this concert with Florence and the Machine.

It was announced that the band would return to Australian shores to perform two special acoustic shows in Sydney and Melbourne, they will perform an acoustic set with songs from Fallen Empires and classic hits such as Chasing Cars and Run. They are also set to return to North America for a short fourteen date tour in which they will co-headline with Noel Gallagher's High Flying Birds with Jake Bugg being the main support act. They will also play three headline shows as part of this leg of the tour

Opening acts
Rams' Pocket Radio (Europe, select dates)
Ed Sheeran (North America, select dates)
Rousseau (Oakland—May 5, Los Angeles)
Gary Go (Dallas, Houston, Austin, Biloxi) 
Everything Everything (United Kingdom & Ireland)
Admiral Fallow (Glasgow)
A Plastic Rose (Belfast—January 25, London—February 11)
Florence and the Machine (Co-Headlining Dublin—July 8)
The Temper Trap (Dublin—July 8)
Noel Gallagher's High Flying Birds (Leg 8—North America),(co-headlining)
Jake Bugg (Leg 8—North America)
Lissie (Leg 8—North America)

Setlist
"Hands Open" 
"Take Back the City"
"Crack the Shutters"
"This Isn't Everything You Are"
"Run"
"In the End"
"New York"
"Set the Fire to the Third Bar"
"Make This Go on Forever"
"Shut Your Eyes"
"Chasing Cars"
"Chocolate"
"Called Out in the Dark"
"Fallen Empires"
"Open Your Eyes"
"You're All I Have"
Encore
"Lifening"
"Just Say Yes"
Source:
Notes

During the show in Belfast on January 24, Snow Patrol performed "You Could Be Happy", "Spitting Games" and "How to Be Dead".
During the show in Glasgow on January 27, the band performed "In the End" and "You Could Be Happy".
During the show in Glasgow on January 28, "Wow", "Ways & Means", "Same", "Grazed Knees", "Dark Roman Wine" and "The Finish Line" was performed.
During the shows in Liverpool & Newcastle, "I'll Never Let Go", "In the End" & "You Could Be Happy" was performed.

Tour dates

1 ^These shows mark the co-headlining dates with Noel Gallagher's High Flying Birds.

Festivals and other miscellaneous performances

 This concert was a part of "Dubai Atlantis Open Air"
 This concert is part of "Provinssirock"
This concert is part of the "NorthSide Festival"
This concert was part of "Rock A Field"
This concert was part of the "Volt Festival"
This concert was part of "Rockin' Park"
This concert is part of "Rock Werchter"
This concert is a part of "Filmnächte am Elbufer"
This concert is part of "T in the Park"
This concert is part of "Bilbao BBK Live"
This concert is part of "Optimus Alive!"
This concert is part of "Gurtenfestival"
This show is part of the Byblos International Festival.
This concert is a part of the "Pentaport Rock Festival"
These concerts are a part of the "V Festival"
This concert is part of the Corona Capitol Festival
This concert is a Homecoming acoustic show. There will be 2 shows on this date.

Cancellations and rescheduled shows

Box office score data

References

External links
Snow Patrol Official Website

2012 concert tours
Snow Patrol concert tours